Suleeswaranpatti is a panchayat town in Coimbatore district in the Indian state of Tamil Nadu.

Demographics
 India census, Suleeswaranpatti had a population of 17,638. Males constitute 50% of the population and females 50%. Suleeswaranpatti has an average literacy rate of 73%, higher than the national average of 59.5%: male literacy is 80%, and female literacy is 67%. In Suleeswaranpatti, 11% of the population is under 6 years of age.

References

Cities and towns in Coimbatore district